Thaísa Daher de Menezes, also known as Thaísa Menezes or Thaísa Daher, is a professional volleyball player from Brazil. She won back-to-back gold medals at the Olympics in 2008 and 2012. She has won numerous Best Spiker and Best Blocker Awards and is often singled out as one of the greatest Brazilian players of all time.

Biography
Thaísa was born in the Campo Grande district, located in the western part of Rio de Janeiro. Her father is a serviceman Domingos de Menezes and her mother Monica Daher is a descendant of immigrants from Lebanon. Until the age of 13, Thaísa was engaged in swimming, but then, following the example of her brother Tiago, she switched to volleyball.

A year later, she was accepted into the youth team of the Tizhuk club, where Julio Cugna, one of the best mentors for working with young athletes, became her coach. In 2002, Thaísa was invited to the Minas team (Belo Horizonte)- one of the strongest in Brazil, with which she won her first club level medal that same season, becoming the silver medalist of the Brazilian championship. In the same 2002 (at the age of 15), Thaísa made her debut in two teams of her country at once - youth and junior, becoming the champion of two championships of South America with them. A year later, the volleyball player became the world champion both among youth teams and among juniors.

Career
Menezes was part of the Brazilian team that won the gold medal at the 2008 Summer Olympics.

Menezes won the silver medal with Sollys Osasco at the 2010 FIVB World Club Championship. She also earned the Best Spiker award.

At the 2011 Pan-American Cup, Menezes was given the Best Blocker award, and also won the gold medal with her national team.

Menezes was part of the national team who won the gold medal at the 2011 Pan American Games held in Guadalajara, Mexico.

In the 2012 FIVB World Grand Prix, Menezes won the silver medal with her national team and the individual award of Best Blocker.

Menezes was part of the national team which won the gold medal at the 2012 Olympic Games held in London, UK.

Playing with Sollys Nestlé Osasco, Menezes won the gold medal and the Best Spiker award in the 2012 FIVB Club World Championship held in Doha, Qatar.

Menezes claimed the silver medal in the 2014 FIVB Club World Championship, playing with Molico Osasco, when her team lost 0–3 to the Russian Dinamo Kazan the championship match. She was named among the championship Best Team as Best Middle Blocker.

Menezes played with her national team, winning the bronze at the 2014 World Championship when her team defeated Italy 3–2 in the bronze medal match.

Personal life

Menezes is of partial Lebanese origin. She was previously married to Guilherme Pallesi then divorced later.

Clubs
  Minas Tênis Clube (2002–2005)
  Rio de Janeiro Vôlei Clube (2005–2008)
  Osasco Voleibol Clube (2008–2016)
  Eczacıbaşı VitrA (2016–2018)
  Hinode Barueri (2018–2019)
  Minas Tênis Clube (2019–)

Awards

Individual
 2010 FIVB Club World Championship – "Best Spiker"
 2011 Pan-American Cup – "Best Blocker"
 2011 FIVB World Grand Prix – "Best Server"
 2012 Summer Olympics South American qualification – "Best Blocker"
 2012 FIVB World Grand Prix – "Best Blocker"
 2012 South American Club Championship – "Best Blocker"
 2013 FIVB Club World Championship – "Best Spiker"
 2013 FIVB World Grand Prix – "Most Valuable Player"
 2013 FIVB World Grand Prix – "Best Middle Blocker"
 2013–2014 Brazilian Superliga – "Best Blocker"
 2014 FIVB World Championship – "Best Middle Blocker"
 2014 FIVB Club World Championship – "Best Middle Blocker"
 2016 FIVB World Grand Prix – "Best Middle Blocker"
 2020 South American Club Championship – "Most Valuable Player"

Clubs

 2005–06 Brazilian Superliga –  Champion, with Rexona-Ades
 2006–07 Brazilian Superliga –  Champion, with Rexona-Ades
 2007–08 Brazilian Superliga –  Champion, with Rexona-Ades
 2009–10 Brazilian Superliga –  Champion, with Sollys Osasco
 2011–12 Brazilian Superliga –  Champion, with Sollys Osasco
 2020–21 Brazilian Superliga –  Champion, with Itambé/Minas

 2009 South American Club Championship –  Champion, with Molico Osasco
 2010 South American Club Championship –  Champion, with Molico Osasco
 2011 South American Club Championship –  Champion, with Molico Osasco
 2012 South American Club Championship –  Champion, with Molico Osasco
 2014 South American Club Championship –  Runner-up, with Molico Osasco
 2015 South American Club Championship –  Runner-up, with Molico Osasco
 2020 South American Club Championship –  Champion, with Itambé/Minas

 2010 FIVB Club World Championship –  Runner-up, with Sollys Osasco
 2012 FIVB Club World Championship –  Champion, with Sollys Nestlé Osasco
 2014 FIVB Club World Championship –  Runner-up, with Molico Osasco
 2016 FIVB Club World Championship –  Champion, with Eczacıbaşı VitrA

References

External links
 Athlete bio at 2008 Olympics website

1987 births
Living people
Volleyball players from Rio de Janeiro (city)
Brazilian women's volleyball players
Brazilian people of Lebanese descent
Volleyball players at the 2007 Pan American Games
Volleyball players at the 2008 Summer Olympics
Volleyball players at the 2012 Summer Olympics
Volleyball players at the 2016 Summer Olympics
Volleyball players at the 2011 Pan American Games
Olympic volleyball players of Brazil
Olympic gold medalists for Brazil
Olympic medalists in volleyball
Medalists at the 2012 Summer Olympics
Medalists at the 2008 Summer Olympics
Pan American Games gold medalists for Brazil
Pan American Games silver medalists for Brazil
Brazilian expatriate sportspeople in Turkey
Expatriate volleyball players in Turkey
Pan American Games medalists in volleyball
Middle blockers
Medalists at the 2011 Pan American Games
Sportspeople of Lebanese descent